Why That Doesn't Surprise Me is the sixth album by The Lucksmiths, released on 5 March 2001 on Candle Records (catalogue number CAN2513).

Track listing
"Music to Hold Hands To" – 3:47
"Synchronised Sinking" – 3:56
"The Great Dividing Range" – 3:17
"Beach Boys Medley" – 1:16
"Broken Bones" – 3:36
"First Cousin" – 4:04
"Don't Bring Your Work to Bed" – 2:44
"Fear of Rollercoasters" – 3:33
"Harmonicas and Trams" – 4:45
"The Forgetting of Wisdom" – 2:01
"Self-Preservation" – 2:02
"How to Tie a Tie" – 3:24
"All the Recipes I've Ever Ruined" – 5:46
"The Year of Driving Langourously" – 4:00

References

The Lucksmiths albums
2001 albums